Temi Le Anne Epstein (born January 6, 1975) is an American former child actress active in the middle 1980s. Her best-known movie is in Friday the 13th Part VI,  but her more remarkable role was the one of "Young Ashton Main" in the 1985 miniseries North and South.

Epstein was born Tamar Le Anne Epstein in Marietta, Cobb County, Georgia and is a graduate from Northwestern University. She is currently an SAT instructor of a Jewish community in Atlanta, Fulton County, Georgia.

She married Evan Levy on September 3, 2000.

Filmography
1999 - Take It Easy as Fawn
1994 - Last Time Out as Julie Davis
1991 - In the Heat of the Night as Terri in episode "Child of Promise" (1991)
1986 - Friday the 13th Part VI: Jason Lives as Little Girl
1985 - North and South as Young Ashton Main

External links

American child actresses
American film actresses
Jewish American actresses
Northwestern University alumni
People from Marietta, Georgia
1975 births
Living people
21st-century American Jews
21st-century American women